NGC 259 is a spiral galaxy located in the constellation Cetus. It was discovered by William Herschel in 1786.

References

External links
 

Cetus (constellation)
Spiral galaxies
Astronomical objects discovered in 1786
0259
002820